Per Il Volo is an Italian aircraft manufacturer based in Galliera Veneta. The company specializes in the design and manufacture of paramotors and aircraft engines.

The company designed and built the first purpose-designed paramotor engine, the Top 80 and also the aircraft to fit it, the Miniplane, both of which remain in production in the 21st century.

Aircraft

See also

List of Italian companies

References

External links

Aircraft manufacturers of Italy
Paramotors